Malye Gorki is the name of several rural localities in Russia:
Malye Gorki, Leningrad Oblast, a village in Ropshinskoye Settlement Municipal Formation of Lomonosovsky District of Leningrad Oblast
Malye Gorki, Republic of Mordovia, a village in Silinsky Selsoviet of Ardatovsky District of the Republic of Mordovia
Malye Gorki, Naro-Fominsky District, Moscow Oblast, a village under the administrative jurisdiction of the Town of Aprelevka in Naro-Fominsky District of Moscow Oblast
Malye Gorki, Ruzsky District, Moscow Oblast, a village in Volkovskoye Rural Settlement of Ruzsky District of Moscow Oblast
Malye Gorki, Nizhny Novgorod Oblast, a village in Yagubovsky Selsoviet of Buturlinsky District of Nizhny Novgorod Oblast
Malye Gorki, Tver Oblast, a village in Verkhnevolzhskoye Rural Settlement of Kalininsky District of Tver Oblast
Malye Gorki, Vladimir Oblast, a village in Petushinsky District of Vladimir Oblast
Malye Gorki, Voronezh Oblast, a settlement in Orlovskoye Rural Settlement of Novousmansky District of Voronezh Oblast

See also
Gorki (disambiguation)